"Cedar Grove", also known as the William Tompkins House, is a historic home located at Cedar Grove, Kanawha County, West Virginia.  It was built in 1844, and is a two-story, five bay, "double pile" rectangular brick house. When built, it had upper and lower verandas across the rear, but these were enclosed about 1892. It features a small entrance portico with a second floor balcony.

It was listed on the National Register of Historic Places in 1975.

References

Houses completed in 1844
Houses in Kanawha County, West Virginia
Houses on the National Register of Historic Places in West Virginia
National Register of Historic Places in Kanawha County, West Virginia